Osvračín is a municipality and village in Domažlice District in the Plzeň Region of the Czech Republic. It has about 600 inhabitants.

Administrative parts
Villages of Dohalice and Mimov are administrative parts of Osvračín.

References

Villages in Domažlice District